Juan Fernando Urango Rivas (born October 4, 1980), best known as Juan Urango, is a Colombian former professional boxer who competed from 2002 to 2012. He held the IBF junior welterweight title twice between 2006 and 2010, and challenged once for the WBC welterweight title in 2009. His nickname of "Iron Twin" is a reference to his twin brother, Pedro Urango, who is also a former boxer.

Professional career
Urango made his professional debut on April 30, 2002, scoring a second-round knockout against Efrain Sotomayor. On August 5, 2004, Urango challenged Mike Arnaoutis for the WBO–NABO light welterweight title, but their fight ended in a majority draw. In his next fight, on December 16, 2004, Urango stopped Ubaldo Hernandez to win the vacant WBC Latino light welterweight title. He unified this with the IBF Latino title by knocking out Francisco Campos in five rounds on April 22, 2005. Urango won his first world championship—the vacant IBF light welterweight title—on June 20, 2006, by scoring a unanimous decision (UD) over Naoufel Ben Rabah, but would lose by the same result in his first defense, on January 20, 2007, against Ricky Hatton (who had vacated the title in March 2006).

2009 was a busy year for Urango: on January 30, 2009, he regained the IBF title (which was again vacant) by defeating Herman Ngoudjo via UD. On May 30, Urango briefly moved up to welterweight, but lost an uncompetitive UD to WBC champion Andre Berto. Returning on August 28, Urango faced Randall Bailey in defense of his IBF light welterweight title. In an action-packed fight, Urango was knocked down for the first time in his career, but responded by knocking down Bailey three times to score a late stoppage in the eleventh round.

On March 6, 2010, Urango attempted to unify his IBF title with that of WBC champion Devon Alexander. The fight was competitive through eight rounds, until Alexander landed a hard right uppercut to send Urango to the canvas. Despite being badly hurt, Urango managed to beat the referee's count and continue momentarily, but was then floored again. He got up for a second time, only for the referee to deem him unable to continue. Urango would spend more than two years away from the sport, retiring to work on a pig farm he had bought in Colombia. He had two comeback fights against journeyman opposition on April 26 and September 14, 2012, but has not fought since.

Personal life
Urango is a devout Christian, and was raised on his family's farm in Montería.

Professional boxing record

References

External links

1980 births
International Boxing Federation champions
Welterweight boxers
Living people
Colombian male boxers
Twin sportspeople
Colombian twins
World light-welterweight boxing champions
Colombian Christians
People from Montería